Föreningen Konstsamfundet (lit. "The Art Foundation Association") is a Finnish association with the goal of supporting the culture of the Swedish-speaking minority of Finland. It was founded in 1940 by vuorineuvos Amos Anderson, a newspaper publisher and a patron of the arts who bequeathed his entire fortune to Konstsamfundet.

Konstsamfundet owns and operates the Amos Anderson Art Museum in Helsinki, the largest private art museum in Finland. It is also the sole owner of the Swedish-language Hufvudstadsbladet newspaper in Finland.

References

External links
 Konstsamfundet 

Swedish-speaking population of Finland
Finnish culture